Commander-in-Chief, Home Forces was a senior officer in the British Army during the First and Second World Wars. The role of the appointment was firstly to oversee the training and equipment of formations in preparation for their deployment overseas, and secondly, to command the forces required to defend the United Kingdom against an enemy incursion or invasion.

The First World War
The post was created for Field Marshal John French, 1st Earl of Ypres in December 1915, after his enforced resignation as the Commander-in-Chief of the British Expeditionary Force in the aftermath of the Battle of Loos. Bitterly disappointed, Lord French regarded the appointment as a demotion. Despite this, he energetically restructured the system of military training, drew up plans to defend the country against a German invasion and devised the first British air defence system, so that incoming Zeppelins and bombers could be tracked and countered by fighters and anti-aircraft artillery.

Commanders-in-Chief, Home Forces, 1915 to 1921
 Field Marshal Lord French – December 1915 to May 1918
 Field Marshal Sir William Robertson – 1918 to 1919 
 Field Marshal Lord Haig – 1919 to 1921

The Second World War

The post of Commander-in-Chief, Home Forces was resurrected for Sir Walter Kirke on 3 September 1939. He devised the first anti-invasion plan of the war in October, known as Operation Julius Caesar. His successor, Sir Edmund Ironside was replaced by Sir Alan Brooke in July 1940. The headquarters was established at Kneller Hall in late 1939 but moved out to St Paul's School in July 1940.

Commanders-in-Chief, Home Forces, 1939 to 1945
 General Sir Walter Kirke – September 1939 to May 1940
 General Sir Edmund Ironside – May to July 1940
 General Sir Alan Brooke – July 1940 to December 1941
 General Sir Bernard Paget – December 1941 to January 1944
 General Sir Harold Franklyn – January 1944 to 1945

References

Sources

Further reading 
 Collier (1956), Defence of the United Kingdom. Dispositions of Home Forces 1 May 1940, accessed November 2011.

Senior appointments of the British Army
British military commanders in chief
1915 establishments in the United Kingdom